Sir Hans Hamilton, 2nd Baronet (1643 – 1731) was an Anglo-Irish politician. 

Hamilton was the son of Sir Robert Hamilton, 1st Baronet, and in 1703 he inherited his father's baronetcy. Hamilton was the Member of Parliament for Armagh County in the Irish House of Commons between 1703 and 1713, before representing Carlingford between 1713 and 1714. His title became extinct upon his death in 1731.

References

1643 births
1731 deaths
17th-century Anglo-Irish people
18th-century Anglo-Irish people
Baronets in the Baronetage of Ireland
Irish MPs 1703–1713
Irish MPs 1713–1714
Members of the Parliament of Ireland (pre-1801) for County Armagh constituencies
Members of the Parliament of Ireland (pre-1801) for County Louth constituencies